Cerylon is a genus of minute bark beetles in the family Cerylonidae. There are about 11 described species in Cerylon.

Species
 Cerylon bescidicum Reitter, 1911 g
 Cerylon californicum Casey, 1890 i c g
 Cerylon castaneum Say, 1826 i c g b
 Cerylon conditum Lawrence and Stephan, 1975 i c g
 Cerylon deplanatum Gyllenhal, 1827 g
 Cerylon distans Lawrence and Stephan, 1975 i c g
 Cerylon fagi Brisout de Barneville, 1867 g
 Cerylon ferrugineum Stephens, 1830 g
 Cerylon hazara Slipinski, 1988
 Cerylon histeroides (Fabricius, 1792)
 Cerylon impressum Erichson, 1845 g
 Cerylon testaceum Fairmaire, 1850 g
 Cerylon unicolor (Ziegler, 1845) i c g b
Data sources: i = ITIS, c = Catalogue of Life, g = GBIF, b = Bugguide.net

References

Further reading

External links

 
 

Cerylonidae
Coccinelloidea genera